Rajaa Betaa was an Indian television series created by Sobo Films Private Limited. It aired on Zee TV. It starred Rrahul Sudhir, Dishank Arora, Shambhabana Mohantey and Pranali Ghogare in lead roles. it was later replaced by Dil Yeh Ziddi Hai.

Plot
Dr. Vedant Tripathi is a successful gynaecologist, but life is not easy for him as he has not been accepted yet by his family.

Cast

Main
 Rrahul Sudhir / Dishank Arora as Dr. Vedant Tripathi - Poorva's husband; Ramesh and Manjula's adoptive son; Sanju's brother 
 Shambhabana Mohantey / Pranali Ghogare as Poorva Tripathi - Vedant's wife; Pankhuri's elder sister; Rahul's ex-fiancée 
Fenil Umrigar as Pankhuri Mishra (antagonist) - in love with Vedant / Poorva's sister 
Ankit Bhardwaj as Rahul (antagonist) - Poorva's ex-boyfriend / ex-fiancé
 Anil Mishra/Sagar Saini as Ramesh Tripathi  (antagonist) - Urmila's eldest son; Manjula's husband; Gomti and Narendra's elder brother; Vedant's adoptive father; Sanju's father
 Geeta Udeshi as Urmila Tripathi (Dadi) - Ramesh, Narendra and Gomti's mother; Radhika, Sanju and Vedant's grandmother

Recurring
 Jatin Arora as Sanju Tripathi - Ramesh and Manjula's son; Vedant's brother; Pankhuri's fiance(2019) 
 Mahjabeen Ali as Sumati Tripathi - Narendra's wife; Radhika's mother (2019)
 Reshma Merchant as Manjula Tripathi - wife of Ramesh; Vedant's adoptive mother; Sanju's mother (2019)
 Sharan Preet Kaur as Gomti Tripathi - Urmila's daughter; Ramesh and Narendra's sister (2019)
 Akansha Bhalla as Radhika - Narendra and Sumati's daughter; Vedant and Sanju's cousin (2019)
 Sarvesh Vyas as Narendra Tripathi - Urmila's son; Sumati's husband; Radhika's father; Ramesh and Gomti's brother(2019)
 Manoj Verma as Shiva (2019)
 Jasmeet Kaur as Parvati (2019)

References

2019 Indian television series debuts
Hindi-language television shows
Television shows set in Mumbai
Indian television soap operas
Zee TV original programming
Indian drama television series